The 1998 Brickyard 400, the 5th running of the event, was a NASCAR Winston Cup Series race held on August 1, 1998 at Indianapolis Motor Speedway in Speedway, Indiana. Contested at 160 laps on the 2.5 mile (4.023 km) speedway, it was the 19th race of the 1998 NASCAR Winston Cup Series season. Jeff Gordon of Hendrick Motorsports won the race.

This is the last Brickyard 400 without Tony Stewart until 2017.

Background
The Indianapolis Motor Speedway, located in Speedway, Indiana, (an enclave suburb of Indianapolis) in the United States, is the home of the Indianapolis 500 and the Brickyard 400. The track's turns are banked at 9 degrees, while the front stretch, the location of the finish line, has no banking. The back stretch, opposite of the front, also has a zero degree banking. The racetrack has seats for more than 250,000 spectators.

Summary
Jeff Gordon became the first repeat winner, holding off Mark Martin for the win. Dale Jarrett dominated the second 100 miles of the race but lost his chance near the halfway point when he ran out of fuel, and coasted back to the pits; he lost four laps but made them up due to numerous cautions. Gordon's victory was the first in the Winston No Bull 5 program.

Top 10 results

Race statistics
 Time of race: 3:09:19
 Average Speed: 
 Pole Speed: 179.394
 Cautions: 9 for 34 laps
 Margin of Victory: under caution
 Lead changes: 10
 Percent of race run under caution: 21.2%         
 Average green flag run: 14 laps

Brickyard 400
Brickyard 400
NASCAR races at Indianapolis Motor Speedway